Ralph O. Yardley (1878 - December 6, 1961) was an American cartoonist who was described by The Honolulu Star-Bulletin as "one of America's widely-known cartoonists." Over the course of his 57-year career, his cartoons were published in The San Francisco Examiner, the Pacific Commercial Advertiser, later known as The Honolulu Advertiser), The New York Globe, and The Stockton Record.

References

1878 births
1961 deaths
Artists from Stockton, California
American cartoonists